Lady A may refer to:
Anita White (born 1958), American singer and activist who uses the stage name Lady A
Lady A, an American country music band previously known as Lady Antebellum